György Véber (born 25 July 1969 in Szeged, Hungary) is a retired Hungarian footballer, who has spent most of his career playing for Újpest FC. He was considered a fan's favourite in Újpest. He played 3 matches between 1992 and 1994 for the Hungarian national team.

Managerial career
In 2012 Véber was appointed as the manager of the Nemzeti Bajnokság I club Mezőkövesdi SE.
 
He worked as a manager in Mosonmagyaróvár (second division) and Fót (second and third division)and a Lombard Pápa TFC (first division).
Az exszegedi Véber György újra az élvonalba vágyik and Somogyvár KÖSE (fifth division) and worked as an assistant manager of Újpest FC.

He wrote a new 2-year agreement at Mezőkövesd-Zsóry SE football team. (2013)

Honours

Club
Újpest FC
 Hungarian League: 1990, 1998
 Runner-up: 1995, 1997
 Hungarian Cup: 1992
 Runner-up 1998

and won in 2013 a Hungarian second division at Mezőkövesd-Zsóry SE.

References
 Ki kicsoda a magyar sportéletben?, III. kötet (S–Z). Szekszárd, Babits Kiadó, 1995, 286. o.,  
sportgeza.hu: Csonttörők nemzeti tizenegye - Kettétört futballkarrierek Törőcsiktől Véberig 
cimpa.hu: Véber György – a szegedi focipályától a pápai kispadig 

1969 births
Living people
Hungarian footballers
Hungary international footballers
Újpest FC players
Győri ETO FC players
Nemzeti Bajnokság I players
Association football midfielders
Pécsi MFC managers
Hungarian football managers
Mezőkövesdi SE managers
Nyíregyháza Spartacus FC managers
Nemzeti Bajnokság I managers
Sportspeople from Szeged